Through A Glass Productions is a film and video production company, formed in Lawrence, Kansas, United States. The company works in feature film, music video, commercial, and documentary production, providing both content producing and crew services.

Notable commercial work 

 "Free The Music" - MTV (production company)
 "The Ivan Brothers" - Capital One (Danny Manning Interview shot for Harvest Films)
 "Just Too Good To Be True by E. Lynn Harris" - Doubleday (production company)

Notable film work 

 Air: The Musical (production company)
 Andy McKee: Joyland (production company)
 Up in the Air (production services)
 The Only Good Indian (production services)
 Last Breath (production services)
 Suspension (production services)
 Nailbiter (production services)
 The Empty Acre (production services)

Notable music video work 

Andy McKee - "Hunter's Moon" (production company)
Andy McKee - "Everybody Wants to Rule the World"  (production company)
Andy McKee - "Joyland"  (production company)
Andy McKee - "Never Grow Old"  (production company)
Lacuna Coil - "I Like It"  (production services)

External links
 Official site
 Through A Glass Productions on Vimeo

Film production companies of the United States
Companies based in Kansas